Colin Alfred Galbraith (3 April 1920 – 8 August 1986) was an Australian rules footballer who played with Melbourne in the Victorian Football League (VFL).

Notes

External links 

1920 births
1986 deaths
Australian rules footballers from Melbourne
Melbourne Football Club players
University Blacks Football Club players
People from Essendon, Victoria